The men's K-4 1000 metres competition in canoeing at the 2008 Summer Olympics took place at the Shunyi Olympic Rowing-Canoeing Park in Beijing between August 18 and 22.  The K-4 event is raced in four-person kayaks.

Competition consists of three rounds: the heats, the semifinals, and the final. All boats compete in the heats. The top three finishers in each of the two heats advance directly to the final, while the remaining four finishers in each heat move on to the semifinal. The top three finishers in the semifinal join the top heat finishers in the final.

Heats took place on August 18, semifinal on August 20, and the final on August 22.

Schedule
All times are China Standard Time (UTC+8)

Medalists

Results

Heats
Qualification Rules: 1..3->Final, 4..7->Semifinal + 8th best time, Rest Out

Heat 1

Heat 2

Semifinal
Qualification Rules: 1..3->Final, Rest Out

Final

References

Sports-reference.com 2008 K-4 1000 m results.
Yahoo! August 18, 2008 sprint heat results. - Accessed August 19, 2008.
Yahoo! August 20, 2008 sprint semifinal results. - accessed August 20, 2008.
Yahoo! August 22, 2008 sprint final results. - accessed August 22, 2008.

Men's K-4 1000
Men's events at the 2008 Summer Olympics